Gibbaeum heathii is a species of succulent plant in the genus Gibbaeum, endemic to South Africa.

Description
This is a small compact succulent, with rounded leaf-pairs that are covered in a fine down. It offsets and eventually can form a large clump. 
This highly variable species has a large number of different varieties.

Distribution
This species is indigenous to an arid area of the Western Cape Province, South Africa, and specifically around the Little Karoo districts of Montagu, Ladismith and Swellendam, where it grows on hot open rocky plains. It favours loam among rocky quartz gravel.

Cultivation
Gibbaeum heathii requires extremely well-drained loamy soil, and some protection from all-day full sun.

It is adapted for a very arid environment, and should receive only occasional water all year round.

References

heathii
Endemic flora of South Africa
Taxa named by Louisa Bolus
Taxa named by N. E. Brown